Sannihit Sarovar is a sacred water reservoir in the Kurukshetra district of Haryana, India. It is believed to be the meeting point of seven sacred Sarasvatis. The sarovar, according to popular belief, contains sacred water. Bathing in the sacred waters of the tank on the day of Amavasya (night of complete darkness), or on the day of an eclipse is believed to bestow blessings equivalent to performing the ashvamedh yajna.

History 
The sarovar, an important part of 48 Kos Parikrama of Kurukshetra, is believed to be the meeting point of seven sacred Saraswatis (see also Sapta Sindhu). The Sarovar, according to popular belief, contains sacred water. Bathing in the waters of the tank on the day of Amavasya (night of complete darkness) or on the day of an eclipse bestows blessings equivalent to performing the Ashvamedha Yajna.

Bathing in this sarovar is believed to offer peace to wandering and unhappy souls. Prayers and pind daan, a memorial service for the dead, is performed here. The Hindu genealogy registers at Kurukshetra, Haryana are also kept here. Alongside the sarovar are small shrines dedicated to Lord Vishnu, Dhruv Narayan, Laxmi Narayan, Dhruv Bhagat, Sri Hanuman and Goddess Durga. The Sannihit Sarovar is believed to be the abode of Lord Vishnu.

See also 
 Vraja Parikrama

References

External links 
Kurukshetra.nic.in

Hindu temples in Haryana
Kurukshetra
Hindu pilgrimage sites in India
Lakes of Haryana
Reservoirs in India
48 kos parikrama of Kurukshetra